Osei Assibey Antwi is a Ghanaian administrator and politician who is a member of the New Patriotic Party (NPP). He is currently the Metropolitan Chief Executive (MCE) of the Kumasi Metropolitan Assembly (KMA) doubling as the Mayor of Kumasi.

Early life and education 
Osei Assibey was born in October 1965. He hails Kumawu Wonoo in the Ashanti Region. He has a Graduate Diploma in Management Studies from Institute of Commercial Management in the United Kingdom. Antwi also holds MBA in Marketing from Paris Graduate School of Management. He is a certified member of the Institute of Commercial Management. Antwi is a member of  both Institute of Financial Accountants (IFA),United Kingdom and the International Professional Manager Association, (IPMA),United Kingdom,

Career 
He worked at Ghana Revenue Authority the then Internal Revenue Service as an assistant Inspector of Taxes responsible for Financial and Administrative. He also worked as the General Manager of Silkcoat Company Ltd in 2015. He was nominated by President Akufo-Addo to serve as Metropolitan Chief Executive of the Kumasi Metropolitan Assembly (KMA) on 13 March 2017, replacing Kojo Bonsu who had resigned in July 2016. He was confirmed on 17 March 2017 and sworn in by the Ashanti Regional Minister Simon Osei Mensah on 17 April 2017.

Politics 
Antwi served as Deputy Ashanti Regional Minister from 2006 to January 2009 during the second term of President John Agyekum Kuffuor after he was nominated in October 2006. He has also served in different capacities for the Ashanti Regional caucus of his party. The most notable amongst them is serving as Vice Regional Vice Chairman from 2000 to 2004 under the regional chairman Chairman FF Anto and from 2004 to 2008, when he served as deputy to Yaw Amankwa. He is also a former parliamentary aspirant for the Manhyia constituency but on two occasions he stood for the primaries he lost to Dr. Kwame Addo Kuffuor, the younger brother of former President John Agyekum Kuffuor in 2007 and Dr Matthew Opoku Prempeh in 2008.

References 

Living people
Mayors of Kumasi
New Patriotic Party politicians
People from Ashanti Region
1965 births